Jørgen de Mylius (born 5 March 1946) is a Danish radio and TV personality that is best known for his work in connection with the Dansk Melodi Grand Prix as a host and commentator.  Sometimes he is referred to as Jørgen Mylius or by his nickname Mylle.

Biography 
He was born on 5 March 1946, at Frederiksberg, Denmark and graduated a mathematical Student from Østre Borgerdyd Gymnasium in 1964.  In 1968 he finished an education as journalist.

In January 1963 he started working for Danmarks Radio, DR. Radio shows such as Top 20, Efter Skoletid, For de unge were created within the first 18 months. He also worked as a radio reporter from among other U.S., Japan, France and Luxembourg up until 1977. In April of the same year he began working in the television department of DR.  His debut as host was in 1978 where he hosted the Dansk Melodi Grand Prix.  All in all he has hosted 11 Dansk Melodi Grand Prix competitions and commentated 19 Eurovision Song Contest competitions.

At the Eurovision Song Contest 1980, he introduced the Danish entry in The Hague.

He has also hosted and produce a series of shows such as Eldorado, Stardust, Musikboxen and Pop-quiz among others.

In 1989 he began hosting the radioshow Mylles Hylde on DR P3 and during 1990-91 he studied film at UCLA in Los Angeles.

During the late 1990s he hosted the popular radioshow De ringer, vi spiller.

Besides his appearance on the work as a host on TV and the radio he has also written biographies of known musician  such as Cliff Richard, Elvis Presley, Jodle Birge.

As of 1999 he works as executive editor for the TV show Hit med Sangen and currently also hosts the radio show Hithouse on Saturdays between 16:05 - 18:50 on DR P4.

References 
 Jørgen de Mylius' website

External links 
 Jørgen de Mylius at the Internet Movie Database

1946 births
Danish radio presenters
Danish television presenters
20th-century Danish biographers
Danish autobiographers
Living people
People from Frederiksberg
Place of birth missing (living people)
Mylius family